Bonfire Studios is a  video game development studio located in Orange County, California. It was founded in 2016 with funding from Andreessen Horowitz and Riot Games.

Games 
Bonfire has not officially announced their first project. However in an interview with Morgan Webb at the VentureBeat Summit in April 2019, Rob Pardo announced they were working with the Unity game engine on an online multiplayer game. He also announced some details of the project.

Pardo also described the pitch process. Everyone in the studio had the opportunity to pitch a game. Of the 40 original ideas, the studio chose 7 to expand into full fledged pitch decks. Everyone then stack-ranked their favorites, and when they chose the game the result was fairly unanimous.

Team 
Rob Pardo, former chief creative officer at Blizzard Entertainment and lead designer of World of Warcraft is joined by former CEO of Nexon America Min Kim, game designer Josh Mosqueira (Homeworld 2, Company of Heroes, Far Cry 3, Diablo III), producer Sigurlína Ingvarsdóttir (Eve Online, Star Wars: Battlefront), and former games journalist Morgan Webb (The Screen Savers, X-Play).

References

Video game development companies
Video game companies based in California
2016 establishments in California